Naryoli Assembly constituency (formerly, Naryaoli) is one of the 230 Vidhan Sabha (Legislative Assembly) constituencies of Madhya Pradesh state in central India. This constituency came into existence in 1976, following the delimitation of the Legislative Assembly constituencies. It is reserved for the candidates belonging to the Scheduled castes from its inception.

Overview
Naryoli (constituency number 40) is one of the 8 Vidhan Sabha constituencies located in Sagar district. This constituency presently covers the Sagar cantonment and part of Sagar tehsil of the district. From 1976 to 2008, Sagar cantonment was part of the erstwhile Sagar constituency.

Naryoli is part of Sagar Lok Sabha constituency along with seven other Vidhan Sabha segments, namely, Bina, Khurai, Surkhi and Sagar in this district and Kurwai, Sironj and Shamshabad in Vidisha district.

Members of Legislative Assembly
 1977: Lila Dhar, Indian National Congress
 1980: Uttam Chand Kundanlal Khatik, Indian National Congress (I)
 1985: Lokman Khatik, Indian National Congress (I)
 1990: Narayan Prasad Kabirpanthi, Bharatiya Janata Party
 1993: Pyarelal Chowdhary, Indian National Congress (I)
 1998: Surendra Chodhary, Indian National Congress (I)
 2003: Narayan Prasad Kabirpanthi, Bharatiya Janata Party
 2008: Shri Pradeep Lariya Ji, Bharatiya Janata Party
 2013: Shri Pradeep Lariya Ji, Bharatiya Janata Party
 2018: Shri Pradeep Lariya Ji, Bharatiya Janata Party

See also
 Sagar Cantonment

References

Sagar district
Assembly constituencies of Madhya Pradesh